Gymnastics events were competed at the 2006 South American Games in Buenos Aires.

Medal summary

Medal table

Artistic gymnastics

Men

Women

Rhythmic gymnastics

Medalists

References

2006 South American Games events
South American Games
2006 South American Games